Saeed Ahmad Khan  (سيد احمد خان in Urdu)  (1900–1996) (Emir 1981–1996) was an adherent, and later third Emir, of the Lahore Ahmadiyya Movement, religious movement which evolved as a sect of Islam. 

1900 births
1996 deaths
Emirs of the Lahore Ahmadiyya Movement
Pakistani Ahmadis
Date of birth missing
Date of death missing